The Torrington executive council was  executive council of British Ceylon. The government was led by Governor Viscount Torrington.

Executive council members

See also
 Cabinet of Sri Lanka

Notes

References

1847 establishments in Ceylon
1850 disestablishments in Ceylon
Cabinets established in 1847
Cabinets disestablished in 1850
Ceylonese executive councils
Ministries of Queen Victoria